Azaleodes micronipha is a moth of the  family Palaephatidae. It is found in Australia from Tamborine Mountain and Lamington National Park in Queensland to Mount Keira and the Barren Grounds Fauna Reserve in New South Wales.

External links
Australian Faunal Directory
Image at CSIRO Entomology
Moths of Australia

Moths of Australia
Palaephatidae
Moths described in 1923